Lecanopteris deparioides is a fern in the Polypodiaceae family. It is native to Malesia and New Guinea.

References 

Lecanopteris
Plants described in 1881
Flora of Malesia
Flora of New Guinea
Taxa named by Vincenzo de Cesati
Taxa named by John Gilbert Baker